Peace and Democracy Group is a Honduran non-governmental organization. Headed by Martha Diaz and funded by USAID, it publicly backed the 2009 Honduran coup d'état, terming the coup a "transition" to democracy in response to an "illegal quest" by deposed president Manuel Zelaya to change the constitution's laws on presidential term limits.

References

Political organizations based in Honduras